DexDrive is a line of home video game console memory card readers released in 1998, allowing data transfer to a PC. It was made by now-defunct InterAct for use with PlayStation and Nintendo 64 memory cards.

Overview

The DexDrive provides PC owners with a console game data storage solution that is more economical than buying many memory cards, and it allowed online sharing. The capacity is only 128 KB, far less than even a floppy disk. Cost and capacity were much more favorable on a PC due to the efficiency of hard disk drives. For the cost of two memory cards, DexDrive owners had the opportunity to store effectively limitless amounts of game data by transferring files as needed between the memory cards and the PC. As PC files, game data can be shared over the Internet or be used with console emulators.

DexDrive connects to the PC via serial port and the DexPlorer Windows driver application. Interact developed a way to use the Game Shark to share save data for Nintendo 64 games that use cartridge-based storage instead of memory cards. A USB version was reportedly in development.

Reception
Core Magazine said the serial port is slow but hardware and software installation is simple. DexChange.net was curated by Interact employees who supply files for games that users have not, and new games were covered quickly, yielding "more saves available that you could ever want". The magazine summarized: "All in all, the DexDrive is a splendid idea, and worth its $39.95 retail price (which is, as Interact points out, the cost of a typical multi-page memory card). The DexDrive may wind up being one of the most novel gaming peripherals since the Analog controller."

See also 
 MaxDrive

References

External links 
 Download user-created Dexter software
 Download PSX Game Save Editor an all-in-one tool for Game Saves
 N64 Drivers from a German site Windows XP or lower

Nintendo 64 accessories
PlayStation (console) accessories
Products introduced in 1997